Becks Creek is a stream in Fayette, Shelby and Christian counties, Illinois, in the United States. It is a tributary of Kaskaskia River.

Becks Creek was named for Paul Beck and his son Guy Beck, pioneers who settled on the creek in 1815.

See also
List of rivers of Illinois

References

Rivers of Christian County, Illinois
Rivers of Fayette County, Illinois
Rivers of Shelby County, Illinois
Rivers of Illinois